Kitsap Transit is a public transit agency serving Kitsap County, Washington, part of the Seattle metropolitan area. The system is based in Bremerton and operates bus service on 40 fixed routes, a foot ferry, a vanpool system, worker-driver services, and dial-a-ride services. The Kitsap Fast Ferries are also operated by Kitsap Transit.

History 

Beginning in 1971, the city of Bremerton operated a municipal transit system that had been bought out from a private company.

A countywide public transportation benefit area (PTBA) was formed in 1978 to explore a transit system for Kitsap County as a whole. A 0.2 percent sales tax was put before voters in May of that year for a countywide system, but was rejected. A second attempt was put on the September 27, 1982 ballot, with a 0.3 percent sales tax and a limited PTBA serving Bremerton, Gorst, Port Orchard, Poulsbo and Silverdale. The PTBA was approved by 55.6 percent of voters, and service began in January 1983, taking over the Bremerton municipal system.

In 1992, Kitsap Transit became the first transit agency in the United States to install a traffic signal preemption system for bus priority, beginning with 40 buses and 42 traffic signals in a year-long trial of the "Opticom" system.

Kitsap Transit formed a public-private partnership with Kitsap Ferry Company to operate a passenger ferry service between Bremerton and Seattle in 2004, replacing a former Washington State Ferries passenger run that was suspended the previous year. The service was suspended in 2007, after voters rejected a sales tax increase to fund the ferry's rising fuel costs. Kitsap Transit, looking to revive the service, placed a 0.3 percent sales tax on the November 2016 ballot to fund fast ferry service, which was passed by voters. The new Kitsap Fast Ferries service began operation on July 10, 2017, traveling 28 minutes between Bremerton and Seattle. A second fast ferry route, connecting Kingston to Seattle, began operating in November 2018.

In 2002, Kitsap Transit purchased Horluck Transportation, the operators of a foot ferry from Bremerton to Port Orchard and Annapolis, for $1.52 million.

During a period of declining sales tax revenue following the Great Recession, Kitsap Transit made major service cuts to make up for a budget shortfall. Sunday and holiday service was discontinued in February 2009, low-performing routes were consolidated or eliminated later that year. Fares were raised twice to $2, and employees were laid off.

In 2015, Kitsap Transit tested a double-decker bus from Alexander Dennis on routes serving ferry runs. The agency debuted a new battery electric bus manufactured by Proterra in April 2018.

Services 
Kitsap Transit oversees the operations of these services:

 Routed bus service (40 routes; 120 buses)
 Foot ferry service (Bremerton to Port Orchard and Annapolis)
 Fast ferry service (Bremerton and Kingston to Seattle)
 ACCESS (Door-to-door/curb-to-curb service for elderly and disabled)
 Worker/Driver (Commuter routes operating between various points in Kitsap County and either the Puget Sound Naval Shipyard in Bremerton or Naval Submarine Base Bangor. Drivers are full-time employees at the Navy installations who are also employed as part-time Kitsap Transit operators.)
 Vanpool
 TIP (Transit Incentive Program), a program for employees at federal work sites.
 SCOOT (Smart Commuter Option of Today), a carsharing program in the urbanized areas of Kitsap County.

Kitsap Transit participates in the ORCA Card program.

Kitsap Transit routes connect to Jefferson Transit, Mason Transit Authority, Pierce Transit and the Washington State Ferries terminals in Bremerton, Bainbridge, Kingston and Southworth.

Administration 

Kitsap Transit is overseen by a ten-member executive board composed of the three county commissioners, the mayor of Bremerton, a Bremerton City Council member, appointed representatives from the cities of Bainbridge Island, Bremerton, Port Orchard, and Poulsbo, an at-large member from the three smaller cities, and a non-voting member representing the agency's labor unions.

Current fleet

References

External links 
Official website

Bus transportation in Washington (state)
County government agencies in Washington (state)
Intermodal transportation authorities in Washington (state)
Ferry companies based in Washington (state)
Transportation in Kitsap County, Washington
Transportation in Seattle
Sound Transit
1983 establishments in Washington (state)